1,2-dihydroxynaphthalene dioxygenase (1,2-DHN dioxygenase, DHNDO, 1,2-dihydroxynaphthalene oxygenase, 1,2-dihydroxynaphthalene:oxygen oxidoreductase) is an enzyme with systematic name naphthalene-1,2-diol:oxygen oxidoreductase. This enzyme catalyses the following chemical reaction

 naphthalene-1,2-diol + O2  2-hydroxy-2H-chromene-2-carboxylate

This enzyme is involved in naphthalene degradation.

References

External links 
 

EC 1.13.11